An administrative centre is a seat of regional administration or local government, or a county town, or the place where the central administration of a commune is located.

Algeria
The capital of an Algerian province is called a chef-lieu. The capital of a district, the next largest division, is also called a chef-lieu, whilst the capital of the lowest division, the municipalities, is called agglomération de chef-lieu (chef-lieu agglomeration) and is abbreviated as A.C.L.

Belgium
The chef-lieu in Belgium is the administrative centre of each of the ten provinces of Belgium. Three of these cities also give their name to their province (Antwerp, Liège and Namur).

France
The chef-lieu of a département is known as the préfecture. This is the town or city where the prefect of the départment (and all services under their control) are situated, in a building known as the prefecture. In every French region, one of the départments has pre-eminence over the others, and the prefect carries the title of Prefect of region X..., Prefect of Department Z... and the city where the regional prefect is found is known  as chef-lieu of the  region or,  more commonly, Regional prefecture. The services are, however, controlled by the prefecture of the départment.

The chef-lieu of an arrondissement, commonly known as the sous-préfecture is the city or town where the sub-prefect of the arrondissement (and the services directly under their control) are situated, in a building called the sub-prefecture. The arrondissement where the département prefecture is located does not normally have a sub-prefect or sub-prefecture, the administration being devolved usually to the Secretary-general of the departmental prefecture, who functions as sub-prefect for the arrondissement.

The chef-lieu of a canton is usually the biggest city or town within the canton, but has only a nominal role. No specific services are controlled by it.  In past decades, there was always a Gendarmerie, a treasurer and a justice of the peace.

Francophone West Africa
Many of the West African states which gained independence from France in the mid-20th century also inherited the French administrative structure of Departments and Communes, headed by a Chief-Lieu.  States still using Chief-Lieu to identify the administrative headquarters of a government subdivision include Senegal, Burkina Faso, Benin, Mali, and Niger.

Taking Niger and Mali as examples, the administrative subdivisions down to the Commune level each have a formal place of administrative headquarters, titled the chef-lieu.  The larger portion of the terminology of administrative division is inherited from colonial rule as part of French West Africa, and has survived and been somewhat modified over time. In both nations there have been remarkably parallel histories.  With the decentralization process begun in both nations in the 1990s, the chef-lieu has transitioned from the location of the Governor, Commandant, or Prefect and their staff, to the location of Commune, Cercles of Mali/Departments of Niger, and Regional Councils and a variety of decentralized bodies. The chefs-lieux of a Region, Cercle or Département, is usually also a Communal chef-lieu. Both nations collect these councils in a "High Council of Collectivites" seated at the nation's capital.  Smaller sub-divisions in Mali's Communes (Villages, Tribal councils, Quarters) are administered from or identified as a Place/Site (Site in French), so the chef-lieu is literally the Chief-Place even at the lowest level.

Jordan
In the Hashemite Kingdom of Jordan, the administrative centres are known as "chief towns" or nahias. Nahias may be in charge of a sub-district (qda), a district (liwa), or a governorate (muhafazah).

Luxembourg
Luxembourg is divided into two judicial arrondissements (Luxembourg City, Diekirch), three administrative districts (Luxembourg City, Diekirch, Grevenmacher), four electoral circonscriptions (constituencies), twelve cantons, as well as 105 communes (municipalities; Luxembourgish: Gemengen).

Arrondissements, districts and cantons have each a chef-lieu and are named after it. The same is true for each commune which is composed of more than one town or village. Usually (with a few exceptions), the commune is named after the communal chef-lieu.

New Caledonia
The chef-lieu indicates the principal city of the provinces of New Caledonia. So Nouméa is the chef-lieu of South Province. But the chef-lieu can also mean the principal area within a town. So Wé is part of the town of Lifou, but is the chef-lieu of Lifou.  In the Loyalty Islands and the other islands, the name of the chef-lieu differs from that of the name of the town. For the towns of the mainland, the chef-lieu has the same name as the town. Nouméa is a town composed only of Nouméa.

Russia
In Russia, several million-plus cities in federal districts have the official status of an administrative center: Moscow (as the main city of the Central Federal District), Vladivostok, Volgograd, Yekaterinburg, Nizhny Novgorod, Novosibirsk, Pyatigorsk, Rostov-on-Don and St. Petersburg. The main cities of regions and municipal districts are also called unofficially the administrative center or simply the center. The only exception to this rule is the republics, for which the term "capital" is used to refer to the seat of government. The capital of Russia is also an entity to which the term "administrative centre" does not apply.

Sweden
In Sweden there are two levels of administrative centre; the local municipal and the regional county.

Central locality  
Central locality (Swedish: "centralort") is a term commonly ascribed to the settlement that serves as a municipal administrative centre. This level handles the local administrative and political tasks of the surrounding settlements. Since central place theory was the guiding principle during the municipal reform 1962–1977, most municipalities were dominated by a larger urban area where the political seat was located. Most municipalities are named for their central locality, but there are several exceptions.

There are many deviations from the central locality principle. Some municipalities are dominated by two or more towns of similar size, and sometimes they share the municipal administration, with the municipality having its official address in one of the towns. For example, both Skillingaryd and Vaggeryd are central localities of Vaggeryd Municipality. Conversely, there are municipalities within metropolitan areas. For example, there are twenty-six municipalities within the Stockholm metropolitan area.

The term central locality has no legal standing and it is unclear how it should be applied to these municipalities. Some municipalities appointing one or several localities to be the central locality.

Residence city  
A residence city (Swedish: "residensstad") is the town or city which is the political and administrative seat of the county. This level handles the more regional political and administrative tasks of the county, such as healthcare and public transport. The name comes from that this is the town or city where the governor (Swedish: "landshövding") have their residence. There are some exceptions to this, however. In the newer amalgamated "greater counties", often referred to as "regions", the administrative centre is placed in one of the older residence cities. Examples of this is  Malmö in Region Scania and Gothenburg in the Västra Götaland Region.

Switzerland
The term chef-lieu is applied to the capital of each Swiss canton.  In 16 of the 26 cantons, the territory is subdivided into districts. Every district also has a location nominated as chef-lieu and each has a prefect.

Tunisia
The term chef-lieu is used to designate the capital of each  gouvernorat (department).  Each of the 24 gouvernorats is subdivided into delegations  (districts) which each have a central city as chef-lieu of delegation.

United Kingdom
In the United Kingdom it is the centre of a local authority, which is distinct from a historic county with a county town.

Popular culture
 The Fiancée of the pirate (1969) is a film by Nelly Kaplan, where the action takes place in a hamlet where everyone spends their time worrying about what everyone thinks about the chef-lieu of the town.

See also
County seat, administrative centres in the U.S.
County town, administrative centres in Ireland and the UK
Local government
Seat of government

References

Government
Regions